Dak Bangla is a Bollywood horror film released in 1987. It was directed by Keshu Ramsay.

Plot
The film turns when Alina begins having the same nightmare every night. She is a princess and is being molested by an ogre, ending in her being murdered. The nightmare somehow leads hand Raj to break into the locked room. This room is identical to the master bedroom. There is a large painting of jjghh, dressed as a princess on the wall. There is a bloodstain across it. An ancient book is cached in the wall behind the painting.

The book reveals that the dak bangla was a royal palace many years ago. Thakur Mansingh was the ruler of that fiefdom. His daughter, princess Sapna, was strolling in the woods at the outskirts of the land when he was suddenly attacked by a hideous figure,  ALinar  ([[ swoapma (actor)|Pra (Dilip Dhawan), comes to the rescue. Ozo is beaten and driven away.

It turns out that Ozo's father is a known devil-worshipper. Inflamed by this humiliation, he appeals to his azeem taquat (evil force, representing his demonic master), for evil powers. Infused with these powers, Ozo breaks into the royal palace and murders the prince and princess (while they are making love); he beheads the princess, causing her blood to spatter over the painting. His powers wane when the royal guard arrives. Thakur Mansingh orders that he be tortured, and ultimately quartered and beheaded.

Ozo's father is summoned to take the remains of his son. Aghast, the old man sews his dead son back together, invokes his evil powers, and transmits his blood (and all his evil powers) into the body. The thakur orders the dungeon sealed and a large figure of Suryadevta (Hindu Sun god) placed across the portal.

The book ends with a sober warning to the reader to never displace the god symbol or enter the dungeon.

Sapna continues having the nightmares. Raj and Sapna are convinced that Sapna is the princess reborn, and that Ozo is inducing these nightmares to claim her again and exact his revenge on her loved ones. Flustered and angered by this, and wanting to end it for once and for all, fweaj and Ss remove the Suryadevta and enter the dungeon. They find the (lifeless) mummy and a skeleton (Alinars's father). Their fears are temporarily put to rest (the mummy appears quite dead).

Around this time, a gang of robbers arrive at the dak bangla. The real chowkidars body is discovered and Shakal reveals himself. He is the ringleader of the robbers. They have recently looted a bank and want to stash the loot at the dak bangla and lie low here until the situation cools off.

With no Suryadevta to check it, the mummy returns on a deadly rampage of murder. Several of the robbers, and a couple of Sapna's friends, are brutally killed by the mummy.

Raj, Sapna, Ajay, Vaishali and Shakal spend the following night fleeing from the mummy (who possesses telekinetic powers). Around daybreak, after a few more casualties, they manage to lure the mummy back into the dungeon. Raj sets a trap where he embeds a large hook (connected to a pulley that pulls it upwards and out of the dak bangla) into the mummy and has it yanked out of the building and into the sunlight. Fatally exposed to the rising sun, the mummy spontaneously catches fire and ultimately perishes to the will of Suryadevta. Ajay, who distracted the mummy so Raj could hook it, is killed in the encounter.

The film ends with the entire gang breathing much-needed relief.

Cast
Rajan Sippy as Raj
Swapna as Sapna / Princess Sapna
Ranjeet as Shakal / Khursheed Khan
Mazhar Khan as Munna, Shakal's brother
Marc Zuber as Ajay
Dilip Dhawan
Narendra Nath as Thakur Maan Singh
Praveen Kumar Sobti as Ozo / Mummy
swompma as Alinar / Mummy

Soundtrack

External links

References

1987 films
1980s Hindi-language films
1987 horror films
Indian horror films
Films scored by Bappi Lahiri
Films directed by Keshu Ramsay
Hindi-language horror films